Sunshine Salvation is the third full-length studio album by Australian band 26, released on 26 October 2012 by Floodboy Records.

On 14 October, 26 launched the album with a one-off show in their home town of Brisbane, Australia. The intimate pre-release event involved the band playing the album live and in full, from start to finish, at the Black Bear Lodge in Fortitude Valley, Queensland.

Track listing

Personnel
Nick O'Donnell — lead vocals, guitar
Drew Fellows — keys, vocals
Ross Duckworth — bass, vocals
Iain Wilson — drums, vocals
 Luke Stephans --- keys, darkness
 Daniel Norman --- vocals, walrus

References

2012 albums
26 (band) albums